Gustav Slanec (20 May 1913 – 18 June 1974) was an Austrian speed skater. He competed at the 1936 Winter Olympics and the 1948 Winter Olympics.

References

1913 births
1974 deaths
Austrian male speed skaters
Olympic speed skaters of Austria
Speed skaters at the 1936 Winter Olympics
Speed skaters at the 1948 Winter Olympics
Sportspeople from Vienna